Campeonato de Portugal may refer to:
Campeonato de Portugal (1922–1938), a defunct knockout Portuguese association football competition that preceded the Taça de Portugal
Campeonato de Portugal (league), the fourth-tier Portuguese association football league